During the 2011–12 season, Morecambe F.C. competed in League Two.

League table

Squad statistics

Appearances and goals

|-
|colspan="14"|Players featured for Morecambe but left before the end of the season:

|-
|colspan="14"|Players featured for Morecambe on loan this season and returned to their parent club:

|}

Top scorers

Disciplinary record

Results

Pre-season friendlies

League Two

FA Cup

League Cup

Football League Trophy

Transfers

Awards

References 

2011–12
2011–12 Football League Two by team